Cerulean is a shade of blue.

Cerulean may also refer to:

Animals named for the colour
 Cerulean cuckooshrike
 Cerulean kingfisher
 Cerulean flycatcher
 Cerulean warbler
 Cerulean-capped manakin

Culture
 Cerulean (album), the debut album of electronic artist Baths
 Cerulean, the second album from the indie pop band The Ocean Blue
 "Cerulean", a 2016 song by Blank Banshee from MEGA
 Cerulean City, a city in the Pokémon franchise's fictional Kanto region

Places
 Cerulean, Kentucky, a small town in the United States
 Cerulean Tower, a skyscraper in Tokyo

Other
 a Green fluorescent protein derivative